Kerakat or Kirakat is a town and nagar panchayat in Jaunpur district of the Indian state of Uttar Pradesh with a population of approximately 13,500. It is situated near the Gomati River, which helps the land around the town stay very fertile. Kerakat or Kirakat forms a part of Varanasi Division. It is located 30 km east of the city of Jaunpur and 279 km from Lucknow, the capital of Uttar Pradesh.

The town's Postal Index Number is 222142 and it has a postal head office, as well as a police station. It is also a block and tehsil.

History
Kerakat was known as Kitagiri in Gautam Buddha's time. According to Kitagiri Sutta, Majjim Nikaya of Suttapitaka, .

Demographics
As of the 2011 Census of India, Kerakat nagar panchayat had a population of 13,525, of which males were 6,987 and females 6,538. Population within the age group of 0 to 6 years was 1,804. The total number of literates in Kerakat was 9,475, which constituted 70.1% of the population with male literacy was 75.2%, and female literacy is 64.6%. The effective literacy rate of 7+ population of Kerakat was 80.8%, of which male literacy rate was 87.2% and female literacy rate was 74.1%. The Scheduled Castes population was 1,835. Kerakat had 1924 households in 2011.

Administration
The town is a part of Machhlishahr constituency for national elections and is Kerakat (Vidhan Sabha constituency) (itself a constituency) for state elections.

Places of interest
 Adi Mata Kali Temple, Kerakat. Built in 1867. 
 Gomateshwar Mahadev Temple, Kerakat

Transportation

Rail
Kirakat railway station is a small railway station which belongs to the North Eastern Railway. Kerakat railway station is one of the railway station on the Aunrihar-Kerakat-Jaunpur Line section. The station is situated 0.7 kilometres (0.43 mi) north side from Kerakat Main Market. The station falls under the administration of Varanasi division, North Eastern Railway zone. The station Code is KCT.  Many passenger trains, including expresses, stop at the station. Neighbourhood stations are Dobhi and Gangauli. The closest major station are Jaunpur Junction Railway Station, Varanasi Junction and Aunrihar Junction.

Road
Driving distance from Kerakat to the District headquarters Jaunpur is 30 km. Kerakat is also well connected by road to Varanasi, Azamgarh, Ghazipur and other cities of Uttar Pradesh.

A 4-lane highway has been proposed linking Varanasi to Ayodhya which will pass through Kerakat and Shahganj tehsil of  Jaunpur.

Air
The closest major airport to Kerakat is Lal Bahadur Shastri Airport at Varanasi, 31 km by road. Another nearby airport is Azamgarh Airport.

Education
Shri Ganesh Rai Post Graduate College (SGRPGC)
Public Inter College, Kerakat

Notable people
Ravi Kishan, an actor in Bhojpuri cinema and Bollywood, is from Kerakat. He has also worked in Tamil, Telugu, Kannada, Gujrati, English and other language films.

See also
Anapur
Bhadehari

References

External links
 Data from the 2001 Census
 City Population : Uttar Pradesh

 
Cities and towns in Jaunpur district